The Indomalayan pencil-tailed tree mouse or simply pencil-tailed tree mouse (Chiropodomys gliroides) is a species of arboreal rodent in the family Muridae. It is found in northeastern India, southern China (including Hainan), Myanmar, Thailand, Laos, Cambodia, Vietnam, Peninsular Malaysia, and Indonesia (Java, Sumatra, the Mentawai Islands, and some other islands). This locally abundant but patchily distributed species occurs in primary and secondary forests, without affinity to particular forest types. It can suffer from deforestation and is sometimes harvested for consumption.

Nesting 
Like all members of the genus Chiropodomys, it builds its nest between stalks of bamboo. It does this by constructing a bundle of leaves and branches between the two stalks, then gnawing through part of the bamboo stalks so that they may enter into the nest. The mice are sociable in nature, and may share their nests with other mice.

References

Chiropodomys
Rats of Asia
Rodents of Cambodia
Rodents of China
Rodents of India
Rodents of Indonesia
Rodents of Laos
Rodents of Malaysia
Rodents of Myanmar
Rodents of Thailand
Rodents of Vietnam
Fauna of Hainan
Least concern biota of Asia
Mammals described in 1856
Taxa named by Edward Blyth
Taxonomy articles created by Polbot